Mary Margaret Wood (February 9, 1892 – March 18, 1978) was an American actress of stage, film, and television. She is best remembered for her performance as the title character in the CBS television series Mama (1949–1957), for which she was nominated for a Primetime Emmy Award for Outstanding Lead Actress in a Drama Series; her starring role as Naomi, Ruth's mother-in-law, in The Story of Ruth (1960); and her final screen appearance as Mother Abbess in The Sound of Music (1965), for which she received an Academy Award nomination and a Golden Globe Award.

Career

Mary Margaret Wood was born in Brooklyn, New York, the daughter of Eugene Wood, a journalist, and Mary Gardner, a telegraph operator. She studied voice in France with soprano Emma Calvé. Wood was an early member of the Actors' Equity Association, spending nearly 50 years onstage, beginning in the chorus and becoming known as a Broadway singer and star. Wood made her stage debut in 1910, as part of the chorus for Naughty Marietta. In 1917, she starred in Maytime, in which she introduced the song "Will You Remember". She starred in several other musicals before playing the role of Portia in a 1928 production of The Merchant of Venice. From the late 1920s until the late 1930s, Wood had lead roles in musicals staged in London and New York. She was selected by Noël Coward to star in the original London production of his wildly successful operetta Bitter Sweet.

According to a 1920 profile, Wood also wrote plays "in collaboration with her father and with Samuel Merwin." She was a member of the Algonquin Round Table.
 
In 1941, she starred in the New York premiere of Blithe Spirit as Ruth Condomine, whose husband is tormented by the ghost of his deceased first wife. Wood did not star in many films. Her few film appearances include roles in Jalna, A Star Is Born, Call It a Day, The Housekeeper's Daughter, The Bride Wore Boots, Magnificent Doll, and Dream Girl. From 1949 to 1957, she played matriarch Marta Hansen on the popular series Mama, based on the 1943 Broadway play and 1948 film I Remember Mama. When General Foods cancelled the program, there was so much protest that CBS brought it back on Sunday afternoon, this time as a filmed series. As the network did not have all the affiliate station clearances that were needed, the show was put into syndication, where it was a huge success. Producers filmed 26 episodes. 

Following "Mama", Wood was seen in episodes of Zane Grey Theatre and The Nurses. She co-starred with comedian Imogene Coca on Broadway in The Girls in 509. In October 1963, she and Ruth Gates appeared in the one-act play Opening Night, which played in off-Broadway. Wood portrayed Fanny Ellis, a once famous star who prepares for a performance; the play lasted 47 performances. Gates played "Aunt Jenny" on Mama, which starred Wood.

Wood returned to movies in the 1960 CinemaScope production The Story of Ruth in a co-starring role as the mother-in-law, Naomi, of the title character, although she pointed out the lack of verisimilitude in her own casting as a biblical matriarch, i.e. a "blonde, blue-eyed Jewess". Her final screen appearance was as the Mother Abbess in The Sound of Music (1965), for which she was nominated for the Academy Award for Best Supporting Actress and the Golden Globe Award for Best Supporting Actress - Motion Picture. She was thrilled to be in the movie, but she knew she could no longer sing "Climb Ev'ry Mountain". She was dubbed (for singing) by Margery McKay. In her autobiography, Marni Nixon, who appeared in the film as Sister Sophia, said Peggy especially liked McKay's singing voice because she sounded as Peggy did in her younger days. In 1969, Wood joined the cast of One Life to Live as Dr. Kate Nolan, and had a recurring role until the end of the year.

Other
Her first autobiography How Young You Look was published by Farrar and Rinehart in 1941. The updated version Arts and Flowers appeared in 1963. She wrote a biography of actor John Drew, Jr. and a novel titled The Star Wagon as well as co-wrote the play Miss Quis. Wood received numerous awards for her theatrical work and for a while was president of the American National Theater and Academy (ANTA).

Personal life
Wood was married and widowed twice. Her first husband (poet/writer John Van Alstyne Weaver) died at the age of 44. She gave birth to their son (David Weaver) in 1927 at the age of 35. Her second husband (William H. Walling, whom she wed in 1946) was an executive in the printing business who died in 1973. They were married for 27 years. She was a devout Episcopalian and a member of the Episcopal Actors Guild.

Death
Wood died on March 18, 1978, at age 86, in Stamford, Connecticut, following a stroke.

Filmography

Film

Television

Stage (partial list of appearances) 

 Love O' Mike (1917)
 Maytime (1917)
 Buddies (1919)
 Bitter Sweet (1929)
 Old Acquaintance (1940)
 Blithe Spirit (1941)

References

External links

 Peggy Wood portrait gallery at NY Public Library Billy Rose Collection
1916 portrait with her K9 pal(Univ. of Washington, Sayre collection)
 Peggy Wood, in 1935, with literary friends, ..bottom left to right, Blanche Oelrichs, Dorothy Parker, Woods ..top left to right: John Colton, Howard Greer, Dudley Murphy
Wood and her son

1892 births
1978 deaths
Actresses from New York City
American stage actresses
American film actresses
American television actresses
People from Brooklyn
20th-century American actresses
20th-century American Episcopalians
Algonquin Round Table